Acacia constablei, commonly known as the Narrabarba wattle, is a species of Acacia native to eastern Australia, and is listed as a vulnerable species.

Description
It has smooth mottled to light grey bark with angled to terete branchlets with knobbly ridges. The shrub usually blooms between June and August but has also been known to bloom between February and March. It produces pale yellow to creamy white spherical flower heads. The Inflorescences appear as up a maximum of 12 flowers-heads grow per axil at the base of the leaf.

Taxonomy
The species was first formally described by the botanist Mary Tindale in 1980 as part of the 
work Notes on Australian taxa of Acacia as published in the journal Telopea. It was reclassified as Racosperma constablei by Leslie Pedley in 2003 then transferred back into the genus Acacia in 2006. The specific epithet honours Ernest Francis Constable who was once the botanical collector for the Royal Botanic Gardens, Sydney.

Distribution
Another smaller population in situated in Beowa National Park. The species is found on rocky rhyolite and apatite ridge-tops with nutrient poor skeletal sandy soils but sometimes in brown to black loamy soils.

See also
 List of Acacia species

References

constablei
Fabales of Australia
Flora of New South Wales
Taxa named by Mary Tindale
Plants described in 1980